Engineering aid (abbreviated as EA) is a  United States Navy occupational rating.

Engineering aids plan, supervise and perform tasks required in construction surveying, construction drafting, planning and estimating and quality control; prepare progress reports, time records, construction schedules and material and labor estimates; establish/operate a basic quality control system for testing soils, concrete and bituminous materials; prepare, edit and reproduce construction drawings; make control surveys, performing such tasks as running and closing traverses, surveying for excavations and obtaining and converting field notes into topographic maps; maintain individual combat readiness and perform tasks required in combat and disaster preparedness or recovery operations. 

The engineering aid's rating insignia shows a Philadelphia Rod, and alludes to the rating's original job, which was conducting surveys.

At the senior chief petty officer level, the engineering aid rating merges with the builder and steelworker ratings.  At this level, they are referred to as a senior chief constructionman (abbreviated CUCS).

At the master chief petty officer level, they merge with all other construction ratings as a master chief seabee (abbreviated as CBCM).

References

See also
List of United States Navy ratings

United States Navy ratings